Mapiri Municipality is the seventh municipal section of the Larecaja Province in the  La Paz Department, Bolivia. Its seat is Mapiri.

Languages 
The languages spoken in the Mapiri Municipality are mainly Spanish, Quechua and Aymara.  

Ref.: obd.descentralizacion.gov.bo

References 
 www.ine.gob.bo / census 2001: Mapiri Municipality

External links 
 Old map of Larecaja Province (showing its previous political division)

Municipalities of La Paz Department (Bolivia)